Saint-Genest may refer to the following places in France:

 Saint-Genest, Allier, a commune in the department of Allier
 Saint-Genest, Vosges, a commune in the department of Vosges
 Saint-Genest-d'Ambière, a commune in the department of Vienne
 Saint-Genest-de-Beauzon, a commune in the department of Ardèche
 Saint-Genest-de-Contest, a commune in the department of Tarn
 Saint-Genest-Lachamp, a commune in the department of Ardèche
 Saint-Genest-Lerpt, a commune in the department of Loire
 Saint-Genest-Malifaux, a commune in the department of Loire
 Saint-Genest-sur-Roselle, a commune in the department of Haute-Vienne
 Bouchy-Saint-Genest, a commune in the department of Marne
 Saint-Remy-en-Bouzemont-Saint-Genest-et-Isson, a commune in the department of Marne